Nasar Rural District is a rural district (dehestan) in Arvandkenar District, Abadan County, Khuzestan Province, Iran. At the 2006 census, its population was 5,275, in 1,067 families.  The rural district has 28 villages.

References 

Rural Districts of Khuzestan Province
Abadan County